William Hahn (born  Carl Wilhelm Hahn; 7 January 1829 – 8 June 1887), was a German painter active in the United States known for his genre paintings of California. Born in Ebersbach, Saxony, he trained at the Dresden Academy of Fine Arts and the Düsseldorf Academy.  He befriended Scotch artist William Keith, and accompanied Keith to the United States, where the two founded a Boston studio before traveling to California.

References

External links

Painters from California
German genre painters
19th-century German painters
19th-century German male artists
1829 births
1887 deaths
Kunstakademie Düsseldorf alumni
People from Ebersbach-Neugersdorf
Dresden Academy of Fine Arts